Diamond Head or Diamondhead may refer to:

Film and television
 Diamondhead, a character in the television series Ben 10
 Diamond Head (film), 1963
 The Diamond Head Game, a 1975 American game show

Music
 Diamond Head (English band), a British heavy metal band formed in 1976
 Diamond Head (Diamond Head album), Diamond Head's self-titled seventh studio album
 Diamond Head (Japanese band), a Japanese pop/rock band formed in 2000
 Diamond Head (Phil Manzanera album), a 1975 album by Phil Manzanera
 Diamondhead (album), a 2008 album by jazz saxophonist David "Fathead" Newman
 "Diamond Head", an instrumental song by The Beach Boys from the 1968 album Friends
 "Diamond Head" (song), an instrumental song by The Ventures from the 1964 album Walk, Don't Run, Vol. 2

Places
 Diamond Head, Hawaii, volcanic cone on the Hawaiian island of Oahu
 Diamondhead, Mississippi

Other uses
 Diamondhead (comics), a Marvel Comics character
 USS Diamond Head (AE-19), a 1945 World War II and Cold War ammunition supply ship